Kawczyn may refer to the following places:
Kawczyn, Czarnków-Trzcianka County in Greater Poland Voivodeship (west-central Poland)
Kawczyn, Kościan County in Greater Poland Voivodeship (west-central Poland)
Kawczyn, Świętokrzyskie Voivodeship (south-central Poland)
Kawczyn, Pomeranian Voivodeship (north Poland)
Kawczyn, West Pomeranian Voivodeship (north-west Poland)